Body of Proof is an American medical/crime comedy-drama television series that ran on ABC from March 29, 2011, to May 28, 2013, and starred Dana Delany as medical examiner Dr. Megan Hunt. The series was created by Christopher Murphey and produced by ABC Studios. On May 10, 2013, ABC canceled the series after three seasons.

Overview and production
The series stars Dana Delany as Dr. Megan Hunt, a medical examiner, and it focuses on Hunt's efforts to balance the demands of her professional life, dealing with solving cases and analyzing bodies, with her personal life, trying to reconnect with her estranged daughter.  Hunt was a top-flight neurosurgeon, until she had a life-changing automobile accident and then accidentally killed a patient on the operating table. This resulted in her resignation, and retirement from the profession altogether. Though set in Philadelphia, the first season of Body of Proof was filmed in Providence, Rhode Island and some other locations including Warwick and Woonsocket, Rhode Island. The medical examiner's office is actually the GTECH HQ / Providence Warwick Visitors Bureau and surrounding buildings superimposed on the real Philadelphia skyline. The series was originally titled Body of Evidence, but was later renamed Body of Proof. The second season of the show was announced to be filmed in Los Angeles to take advantage of a $7 million tax credit. Body of Proof is the third ABC television series starring Dana Delany in a main character role, the first being the role of Colleen McMurphy in China Beach and the second being Katherine Mayfair in Desperate Housewives.

While filming, real-life technical advisers made sure that the procedures were correct. Jeri Ryan said, "We've got technical advisers that will be with us on set, so we can keep all of the science realistic".

Cast and characters

Main cast

 Dana Delany as Megan 
Hunt
 Jeri Ryan as Kate Murphy
 Geoffrey Arend as Ethan Gross
 Windell Middlebrooks as Curtis Brumfield
 John Carroll Lynch as Bud Morris (seasons 1–2)
 Sonja Sohn as Samantha Baker (seasons 1–2)
 Nicholas Bishop as Peter Dunlop (seasons 1–2)
 Mary Mouser as Lacey Fleming (seasons 2–3; 1, recurring)
 Mark Valley as Tommy Sullivan (season 3)
 Elyes Gabel as Adam Lucas (season 3)

Recurring cast
 Jeffrey Nordling as Todd Fleming
 Joanna Cassidy as Joan Hunt
 Cliff Curtis as Derek Ames
 Nathalie Kelley as Dani Alvarez
 Jamie Bamber as Aiden Welles
 Luke Perry as CDC Officer/Health Commissioner Charlie Stafford
 Annie Wersching as Yvonne Kurtz
 Richard Burgi as District Attorney Dan Russell
 Lorraine Toussaint as Police Chief Angela Martin
 Marisa Ramirez as Officer Riley Dunn
 Micah Berkley as Officer James Wood

Episodes

Release

Broadcast
The show was set to premiere on Friday nights on ABC on October 22, 2010. Following the quick cancellations of Thursday-night drama My Generation and Wednesday-night drama The Whole Truth, though, the network held back the series. The series premiered Tuesday, March 29, 2011, at 10:00 pm Eastern/9:00 pm Central, replacing Detroit 1-8-7.  The last of its nine first season episodes aired May 17, 2011, four days after ABC renewed the series for a second season. The show's second season ran from September 20, 2011, to April 20, 2012, and had a total of 20 episodes, four of which were held over from the first season.  On May 11, 2012, ABC officially renewed Body of Proof for a third season of 13 episodes. Season 3 premiered on Tuesday, February 19, 2013, at 10:00 pm Eastern/9:00 pm Central, and ended on May 28, 2013.

On May 10, 2013, in spite of improved ratings, Body of Proof was cancelled by ABC after three seasons. Immediately after the cancellation news,  reports arose  that the series might be picked up by a cable television network, with TNT, USA Network, and WGN America all showing interest. On May 23, 2013, a representative for ABC Studios confirmed that Body of Proof would not move to a new network.

On October 23, 2013, the show was reported as possibly being revived for a fourth season by ABC due to much of the broadcaster's new slate underperforming. 
On November 11, 2013, Dana Delany confirmed that Body of Proof would not return for another season.

International broadcasts

In Canada, Body of Proof aired on City, simulcast with the ABC broadcast.

The series premiered in Italy on January 25, 2011, on the pay TV channel Fox Life.

After the Italian world premiere, Body of Proof was scheduled to debut in other European countries before the American start.

In Russia, the series premiered on February 7, 2011, on  Channel One.

In the United Kingdom, the series premiered on July 19, 2011, on Alibi, channel head Steve Hornsey said of picking up the series, "As TV's ultimate compendium of crime drama, Alibi aims to select the very best series in the genre from around the globe. Body of Proof is exactly that. A stand-out show that promises to be a huge hit in the US, Body of Proof means more premium and exclusive content for the channel – and more thrilling and engaging viewing for our audience." The series premiered on January 10, 2012 on Channel 5 and Channel 5+1 (Freeview / FTA).

In Bulgaria, the show premiered on March 17, 2011 on Fox Crime, while in the U.S., the series first aired on March 29.

In Latin America, the show was broadcast in 2011 by Sony Entertainment Television.

In India, the series premiered on April 8, 2011, on Zee Café. In Australia, the series premiered on August 8, 2011, on Seven Network, at 8:30 pm.

However, in Australia, Channel Seven is well known for unexpectedly changing time slots, nights, or not even finishing airing a show, almost always without advertising the said changes, as is the case for Body of Proof. This resulted in low ratings for the show due to viewer frustrations.

In Germany, it premiered August 24, 2011, on ProSieben. On January 20, 2012, season two premiered on sister station kabel eins. In Germany, the original episode five of season two aired as episode 10 of season one on ProSieben. In Poland, the series premiered on February 23, 2011, on Fox Life HD. In South Africa, it premiered on December 8, 2011 on MNet.

In Slovenia, the series premiered on December 13, 2011, on POP TV, at 10:35 pm.

In Norway, the series premiered on January 1, 2012, with double episodes on TV Norge, at 9:30 pm.

In Finland, the series premiered on December 21, 2011, on Nelonen, at 9:00 pm, replacing Grey's Anatomy.

In Latvia the series premiered on February 21, 2012, on Fox life, at 9:00 pm.

In Hong Kong the series premiered on February 22, 2012, on TVB Pearl, at 8:30 pm.

In Ireland, the show premiered Saturday, March 10, 2012, on RTÉ1, at 11.15 pm.

In Japan, the show premiered on June 6, 2012, on WOWOW, in a dubbed version, and season two started in August 2012 on the same channel.

In Brazil, the show premiered on January 10, 2013 on Sony Entertainment Television.

In France, the series was broadcast first on pay-channel Canal+ starting on December 8, 2011, then on M6 from March 14, 2013.

As of April 25, 2013, the show started broadcasting in Albania on AS.

In Serbia, it premiered on FoxLife.

In Romania, it premiered on National TV in 2012, which dubbed it (actually in Romanian subtitle) just for the first season. In 2014, AXN Romania subtitled all the seasons. Unfortunately, the third season aired late in 2015.

Home media
 

 The Region 2 + 4 DVDs of season 1 contain the episodes in production order, rather than the order they were aired in. This has resulted in them including 4 episodes which were filmed in season 1 but aired as part of season 2.

Reception

Critical response 
The show was met with mixed reviews: Metacritic summarizes the opinions of 21 critics in giving the show's first season a score of 56 out of 100. Entertainment Weekly  included the show in the 10 TV events to look forward to in 2011.

Critic David Hinckley from the New York Daily News gave the show a positive review, noting it "would be interesting enough if it were just Quincy with better legs. Add the other elements and you have something worth checking out at 10 o'clock". Other reviews were more negative, commenting on the clichéd plot and character development. Las Vegas Weekly critic Josh Bell commented that "The problem is that Megan's personal issues are as clichéd and clumsily presented as her boilerplate murder cases, and the show makes strained connections between the two that don’t really hold together." The Detroit News called it "saggy, predictable and preachy, the series debut was delayed for months and still doesn't have what it takes to impress viewers. What a poor replacement for Detroit 1-8-7."  The Los Angeles Times said "Murphey and the writers will have to do a lot of heavy lifting for Body of Proof to transcend its immediate predictability. There's only so much Delany can do with a cardboard show. God may be in the details, but the walls still have to hold."

Ratings 
The series premiere (Tuesday, March 29, 2011) drew 14 million viewers. It finished in the top 10 in Nielsen ratings for the week, and was the second-most watched premiere of the 2010–11 season, following the CBS series Hawaii Five-0. ABC ran the second episode on Sunday April 3, 2011; it dropped to 8.5 million viewers. The third episode aired two days later and drew 11 million viewers; the show again won its time slot. The first season averaged 13.68 million viewers making it the second most-watched scripted drama on ABC.

Awards and nominations

See also
 List of fictional medical examiners

References

External links 
 

 
2010s American comedy-drama television series
2010s American medical television series
2010s American mystery television series
2011 American television series debuts
2013 American television series endings
American Broadcasting Company original programming
English-language television shows
Fictional portrayals of the Philadelphia Police Department
Television series by ABC Studios
Television shows set in Philadelphia